Piera Fassio (born 29 June 1935) is a former Italian long jumper.

Career
Five-time national champion at senior level, four-time in row in long jump and one in women's pentathlon, from 1952 to 1958, she boasts also 19 caps un the Italy national athletics team from 1952 to 1959.

National records
 Long jump: 5.74 m ( Turin, 12 June 1955) until 10 June 1956

National titles
Fassio won five national championships at individual senior level.

Italian Athletics Championships
Long jump: 1955, 1956, 1957, 1958 (4)
Pentathlon: 1952 (1)

See also
Women's long jump Italian record progression

References

1935 births
Living people
Italian female long jumpers
Italian female pentathletes
Sportspeople from Turin
20th-century Italian women